Foxton railway station serves the village of Foxton in Cambridgeshire, England. The station is operated by Great Northern.

It is located adjacent to the busy A10 level crossing, which is monitored from the nearby signal box. A freight-only branch (the Barrington Light Railway) diverges to the west beyond the crossing south of the station, serving the nearby Barrington cement works & quarry.

Services 
All services at Foxton are operated by Thameslink using  EMUs.

The typical off-peak service in trains per hour is:
 2 tph to 

On weekends, the service is reduced to hourly in each direction.

Platform 2 (for trains to Cambridge) was extended in Summer 2017 to allow 8-car trains to call without straddling the level crossing behind. Platform 1 was not lengthened, as it is located before the crossing and 8-car trains use Selective door operation to open the doors on the front four carriages only.

References

External links 

Railway stations in Cambridgeshire
DfT Category F2 stations
Former Great Eastern Railway stations
Railway stations served by Govia Thameslink Railway
Railway stations in Great Britain opened in 1852